Velyka Dymerka is an urban-type settlement in Brovary Raion (district) of Kyiv Oblast (province) in northern Ukraine. It was founded in 1552 as a village, and it retained that status until it was upgraded to that of an urban-type settlement in 2000. Velyka Dymerka hosts the administration of Velyka Dymerka settlement hromada, one of the hromadas of Ukraine. The settlement is one of the largest localities in the Brovary Raion, with a population of 10,105 as of the 2001 Ukrainian Census. Current population:

People
 Vladimir Pecherin (1807–1885), Russian poet and political figure
 Hryhoriy Vasiura (1915–1987), Red Army lieutenant and Nazi collaborator, moved there in 1955
 Viktor Postol (1984), a Ukrainian professional boxer

References

 
Urban-type settlements in Brovary Raion
Ostyorsky Uyezd
Populated places established in 1552
16th-century establishments in Ukraine